Ibrahim Juma may refer to:

 Ibrahim Juma (athlete), a Tanzanian long distance runner
 Ibrahim Juma (footballer), a Ugandan footballer
 Ibrahim Khalil Juma, an Iraqi wrestler